Ngwa people (Ṅgwà ), an Igboid tribe in south eastern part of Nigeria. It's also the largest and most populous ethnic group in Abia state southeastern Nigeria. In 1979, their population was held at an estimate of approximately 1.8 million people, the current population is estimated to be 4 million+ Within the seventeen local government areas of Abia State, Nigeria. Ngwa people occupy nine Local Government Areas which include: Aba North, Aba South, Isiala Ngwa North, Isiala Ngwa South, Obi Ngwa, Osisioma, Ugwunagbo, Ukwa East, Ukwa West.

Aba North and Aba south make up the popular commercial city: Aba which is known for business, creativity and industrialization. Their ethnonym Ngwa is used to describe the people, their indigenous territory, ethnic group and their native tongue. King Josaiah Ndubuisi Wachuku, who died on Monday 2 January 1950, was Eze, paramount chief and servant leader, Onye Isi: head of Ngwa people during British colonial times.

Origin Of Ndi Ngwa

Accordingly, the present day Ngwa land was, also, inhabited by Ibibio people. There was a man known as Diobu who was a descendant of Iwhuroha. Subsequently, Diobu left Iwhuroha with his followers and was sheltered by Ibibio-Efik people. Notably, Diobu and his followers were highly polygamous. Extensively, Diobu and his followers married Ibibio-Efik women; and became more populated than their host: Ibibio. This triggered Ibibio people to invade and chase them out. Diobu and his followers joined forces with Ohafia and Abiriba people; and fought Ibibio people from all angles. 

The Ibibio did not only loose the war; they, also, lost their Land; and were forced to leave what became Abia State. Till today, the people of Obi-Ngwa Local Government Area are at logger-heads with the Ibibio-Efik people because of that unsettled war. The part that Ohafia warriors conquered is the geographical area known as Abiriba. Ngwa did not have a special place they kept their captured Ibibio slaves; so, they simply Ngwanized them. Population of Ibibio people who were Ngwanized was almost as that of Diobu and his followers. *** Observantly, someone can notice that Ngwa people and Ibibio-Efik people are of the same height; although that has changed, now, due to large intake of proteinous foods by Ngwa people.

Villages on the left bank of Imo are inhabited by Ibibios, who once received Ngwa Ukwu (Diobu) and his brothers. After the Ngwa Ibibio war, Ngwa Ukwu settled at what is now the village of Umuolike where he also established his ancestral shrine. 'Aba Ngwa' in a small hut 'Okpu' which is today the capital of Ngwa-land called 'Okpu-Ala Ngwa.' For many years, those three brothers dwelt around Okpu-Ala Ngwa in peace; but as their families increased in number, they moved apart in different directions. There is a serious attempt by other groups who share similar language with Ngwa to claim Ngwa.

Geographical setting

The area covering old Aba Ngwa division is situated in the tropical rain forest of southern Igbo plain in the present Abia State of Nigeria. It has a population of over 1.8 million people; and an area of little over nine hundred square miles. This area is bounded on the north by the present Umuahia zone, on the west by Owerri and Mbaise, on the east by Ikot-Ekpene and Abak and on the south by Ukwa. Important waterways are: Imo river to the south and west, Aba or Aza River that rises at Abayi and flows south through Aba township into Imo river at a point near Okpontu. Around Nsulu to the northeast, there are two minor rivers; namely: Otamiri and Ohi.

At no point does the land rise above an elevation of 50 feet. The people are largely industrialist, entrepreneurs and farmers, producing yams, cassava, cocoyam, maize and other tropical farm products. Major rural industries include garri and palm produce; in addition to: Akwete cloth weaving in which women from Ihie area were engaged. The old divisional headquarters was Aba, a very important commercial and industrial centre; with major population concentration in:

1.Aba,

2.Mgboko,

3.Osisioma,

4.Umuoba,

5.Owerrinta,

6.Nbawsi,

7.Nvosi and

8.Okpu-Ala-Ngwa.

Modern day Ngwa land is divided into: Obi-Ngwa, Aba-Ngwa, Isiala-Ngwa, Osisioma-Ngwa; spread within Abia State: Nigeria, as LGAs: Local Government Areas; namely:

1.Aba North,

2. Aba South,

3.Isiala Ngwa North,

4.Isiala Ngwa South,

5.Obi Ngwa,

6.Ugwunagbo

7.Osisioma Ngwa.

8. Ukwa East

9. Ukwa West

Ngwa and Nigerian civil war

Accordingly, it is said that during the Nigerian Civil War, Ngwa people suffered a lot like every other Igbo region in eastern Nigeria. Children suffered from kwashiorkor which came from malnutrition and the adults struggled to survive. The struggle for healthy eating continued until a chief reported to be Josiah Duruem Nwangwa began to collect supplies from various organisations; making his home a relief station for the purpose of helping Ngwa people survive during the Civil War. "Great suffering was experienced in the northern Ngwa region, which formed part of the Biafran 'siege economy' during the period between May 1968 and December 1969."

Notable people 

 Eze Eberechi Dick — Eze Udo I of Mgboko Ngwa
 Eze Josaiah Ndubuisi Wachuku — First Eze of Ngwa Land
 Okezie Ikpeazu — Current Governor of Abia State
 Nkechi Ikpeazu — First Lady of Abia State
 Paul Agbai Ogwuma — Nigerian economist and former Governor Central Bank of Nigeria
 Emeka Ananaba — former Deputy Governor of Abia State
 Chris Akomas — former Deputy Governor of Abia State
 Eric Acho Nwakanma — former Deputy Governor of Abia State
 Adolphus Wabara — Former Senate President of Nigeria
 Nkechi Nwaogu — Nigerian politician
 Blessing Nwagba — Nigerian politician
 Enyinnaya Abaribe — Nigerian politician
 Alex Otti — Nigerian economist and politician
 Jaja Wachuku — Nigerian politician
 Chuku Wachuku — Nigerian economist
 Nwabueze Nwokolo — Nigerian lawyer
 Nwakanwa Chimaobi — Nigerian politician
 Anthony Eze Enwereuzor — Nigerian politician
 Chijioke Nwakodo — Former Chief of Staff to Okezie Ikpeazu
 Clifford Ohiagu — Nigerian politician
 Eziuche Ubani — Nigerian politician
 Uche Ikonne — Nigerian academic and former Vice-Chancellor of Abia State University Uturu
 Bright Chimezie — Igbo highlife musician
 Adaora Lily Ulasi — Nigerian writer and broadcast journalist
 Olu Oguibe — Nigerian academic and writer
 Otosirieze Obi-Young — Nigerian writer
 Dandy Jackson Chukwudi — Nigerian writer
 Emeka Okereke — Nigerian photographer
 Emma Ugolee — Nigerian media personality and author
 Chido Nwangwu — Nigerian journalist and editor
 Osinachi — Nigeria visual artist
 Nathan Kanu — Nigerian priest
 Isaac Nwaobia — Archbishop of Aba and Anglican Diocese of Isiala-Ngwa South
 Uche Okechukwu — Ex Nigerian International footballer
 Onyekachi Nwoha — Nigerian footballer
 Luther Obi — Nigerian-South-African rugby player
 Kennedy Ugoala Nwanganga — Nigerian footballer
 Faith Friday Obilor — Nigerian footballer
 Pascal Ojigwe — Nigerian footballer
 Onyekachi Okafor — Nigerian footballer
 Onyekachi Okonkwo — Nigerian footballer
 Henry Onwuzuruike — Nigerian footballer
 Philip Osondu — Nigerian footballer
 Ikechukwu Uche — Nigerian footballer
 Kalu Uche — Nigerian footballer
 Ejike Uzoenyi — Nigerian footballer
 Kennedy Ugoala Nwanganga — Nigerian footballer

References

Igbo clans
Igbo subgroups
People from Abia State